Integrated Defense Systems may refer to:

 Boeing Integrated Defense Systems, the former name of Boeing Defense, Space & Security
 Raytheon Integrated Defense Systems, a subsidiary of Raytheon Company